Mix Nine is a South-Korean survival reality television show.

Contestants 

 English names are according to the official website.
Color Key

Female Contestants

Male Contestants

Contestant notes

Position Battle (Episode 5-6) 

 Color key

 
The members of the winning teams; KkoJjing, Seven Stars, Benefit, Nerd'$, HotSpot, HighQualityst, Mazinger, Bivid, and Cuxy, received a 2000-point benefit.

Formation Battle (Episode 8-10)

Females

Males

Digital Song Battle (Episode 11-12)

Female

Male

Final Battle (Episode 14) 



References

South Korean reality television series
Mix Nine
Mix Nine contestants
Lists of singers
Lists of dance musicians
Lists of pop musicians